Frankfurt (Main) West station ( or Frankfurt Westbahnhof) is a railway station for regional and S-Bahn services in Frankfurt, Germany, on the Main-Weser Railway, in the district of Bockenheim, near the Frankfurt Trade Fair grounds and the Bockenheim campus of the Goethe University Frankfurt.

History 

The station was opened as Bockenheim station in 1849 during the construction of the Main-Weser Railway from Frankfurt to Kassel. The then independent city of Bockenheim was until 1866 in the territory of the Electorate of Hesse-Kassel. The station building was built in a relatively elaborate Renaissance Revival style to a design by Julius Eugen Ruhl.

The first major change in the railways to affect Bockenheim station occurred in 1888 with the opening of the new Frankfurt Central Station. As part of this project a connection was opened on 10 May 1884 from Bockenheim to the Homburg Railway, a connection that could not be built fifteen years earlier during the Homburg line's original construction because the various small states involved failed to come to an agreement.

In addition, a sweeping curve was built for the Main-Weser line's northern approach to the new Central Station. The old ran from the old Main-Weser terminus to Am Hauptbahnhof (the square in front of the Hauptbahnhof) along the current Kaiserstraße and then turned north. Its abandoned path to Bockenheim was turned into a street, which was initially called Bahnstraße, and it is now a series of streets: Hamburger Allee, Friedrich-Ebert-Anlage and Düsseldorfer Straße.

Modern station 
In 1913, the station was renamed Frankfurt West. The historic station building was destroyed in World War II. A modern functional building was built in 1961. During the building of the S-Bahn in the 1970s most of this station was demolished and replaced by a simple building, which seems to be tucked under the elevated S-Bahn line.

The current station has two levels. The ground level is used by regional trains and S-Bahn S6 trains towards the city on platforms 3, 4 and 5. The S-Bahn lines S3, S4 and S5 and S6 towards Friedberg use an approximately one kilometre long elevated section with a two-track elevated station (platforms 1 and 2).

Services 
The station is served by S-Bahn lines S3, S4, S5 and S6.

References

 
 

Railway stations in Frankfurt
Rhine-Main S-Bahn stations
Railway stations in Germany opened in 1848